= Francisco Cañes =

Spanish Franciscan missionary and grammarian (1730–1795)

- Born: 1730
- Died: 1795 (aged 64–65)
- Occupations: missionary and grammarian

Francisco Cañes (1730–1795) was a Spanish Franciscan missionary and grammarian, author of Gramática arábigo-española (1775), a grammar of colloquial Arabic.

Cañes was based at the Spanish Franciscan College in Damascus, where he came in 1757. Two separate editions of his Arabic grammar were published, one in 1775 and one in 1776.

== Works ==
- Gramatica arabigo-española, vulgar, y literal: Con un diccionario arabigo-español, en que se ponen las voces mas usuales para una conversacion familiar, con el Texto de la Doctrina Cristiana en el idioma arabigo, Madrid, 1775
